Trichoplusia obtusisigna is a moth of the family Noctuidae.

References

External links

Moths of Asia
Moths described in 1857
Plusiinae